The Tweed River is a minor river located in the Marlborough district on the South Island of New Zealand.

It drains Lake McRae, Carters and Robinson Saddles on the south-western side of the Inland Kaikōura Range and feeds into the Waiau Toa / Clarence River.  The Tweed River lies within the borders of Molesworth Station.

Rivers of the Marlborough Region
Rivers of New Zealand